The Billings RimRockers was a professional basketball team based in Billings, Montana that competed in the International Basketball Association (IBA) beginning in the 1998–99 season. The team folded along with the IBA after the 2000–01 season.

External links
Billings RimRockers (1998-2001) via The Billings Gazette.

Defunct basketball teams in the United States
Basketball teams in Montana
Sports in Billings, Montana
1998 establishments in Montana
2001 disestablishments in Montana
Basketball teams established in 1998
Basketball teams disestablished in 2001